Dmitrovsk is a town and the administrative center of Dmitrovsky District in Oryol Oblast, Russia, located on the Obshcheritsa River near its confluence with the Nerussa,  southwest of Oryol, the administrative center of the oblast.  Population: 

It was previously known as Dmitriyevka, Dmitrovka (until 1929), Dmitrovsk-Orlovsky (until 2005).

History
It was founded in 1711 as the village of Dmitriyevka. After a church was built there, it became a selo and was renamed Dmitrovka. It was granted town status in 1782, and renamed Dmitrovsk-Orlovsky in 1929. During World War II, Dmitrovsk-Orlovsky was occupied by the German Army from October 2, 1941 to August 12, 1943 and administered as part of the so-called Lokot Autonomy. In 2005, it received its present name of Dmitrovsk.

Administrative and municipal status
Within the framework of administrative divisions, Dmitrovsk serves as the administrative center of Dmitrovsky District. As an administrative division, it is incorporated within Dmitrovsky District as the town of district significance of Dmitrovsk. As a municipal division, the town of district significance of Dmitrovsk is incorporated within Dmitrovsky Municipal District as Dmitrovsk Urban Settlement.

References

Notes

Sources

External links

Official website of Dmitrovsk 
Dmitrovsk Business Directory 

Cities and towns in Oryol Oblast
Dmitrovsky Uyezd (Oryol Governorate)
Populated places established in 1711
1711 establishments in Russia